Based on a True Story is the third studio album by Paddy Milner and was released on 28 May 2007. Recorded in Denmark and London, mixed in Italy it is a truly international affair. The album includes the rarely covered Beatlessong "Hey Bulldog" and a reworking of the Violent Femmes' "Blister in the Sun".

To promote the album, several launch parties were organised, both in London and in Dorset, where Milner grew up.

Track listing
 "Blister in the Sun"
 "Jump Into My Car"
 "Bob (Based on a True Story)"
 "Dust"
 "Standing At The Edge of the World"
 "Hey Bulldog"
 "Smile"
 "Forever Gone"
 "Changes"
 "Frome Time to Time"
 "Got Your Booty Shaking"
 "Big Sounds"
 "Am I a Smoker?"

Release history

References

External links
Official Paddy Milner site

2007 albums
Paddy Milner albums
Bronze Records albums